Ulla-Maija Juurola (née Harkki; born 15 June 1942 in Kuorevesi–25 June 2019) was a Finnish social worker, civil servant and politician. She was a member of the Parliament of Finland from 1995 to 2003, representing the Social Democratic Party of Finland (SDP).

References

1942 births
2019 deaths
People from Jämsä
Social Democratic Party of Finland politicians
Members of the Parliament of Finland (1995–99)
Members of the Parliament of Finland (1999–2003)
Women members of the Parliament of Finland
21st-century Finnish women politicians